The 1995–96 Heineken Cup was the first edition of the Heineken Cup, which was to become the annual rugby union European club competition for clubs from the top six nations in European rugby. Competing teams, from France, Ireland, Italy, Wales and, for the only time to date, Romania (teams from England and Scotland were not permitted to enter the competition by the RFU and SRU respectively), were divided into four pools of three, in which teams played each other only once, meaning one home and one away game per team. The winners of the pools qualified for the knock-out stages.

Teams

Pool stage
The twelve teams were arranged into four pools of three, with each team playing the other team in their pool once. Two points were awarded for a win, and one point for a draw. The four pool winners qualified for the knockout stage.

Pool 1

Pool 2

Pool 3

Pool 4

Seeding

Knockout stage

Semi-finals

Final

The 1996 Heineken Cup Final was the final match of the 1995–96 Heineken Cup, the inaugural season of Europe's top club rugby union competition. The match was played on 6 January 1996 at the Arms Park in Cardiff. The match was contested by Cardiff of Wales and Toulouse of France. Toulouse won the match 21–18 after extra time; they took the lead with two tries in the first 10 minutes, but the kicking of Adrian Davies kept Cardiff level. With the scores at 15–12 as the clock ticked past 80 minutes, Davies stepped up again and slotted over a penalty to take the game to extra time. Christophe Deylaud restored Toulouse's lead with another penalty shortly after the game restarted, before Davies tied the scores up again. Then, going into the final few seconds of extra time, the referee penalised Cardiff for using hands in the ruck; Deylaud slotted the resulting penalty to seal Toulouse's victory.

Match details

References

 
1995–96
1995–96 in French rugby union
1995–96 in Irish rugby union
1995–96 in Italian rugby union
1995–96 in Romanian rugby union
1995–96 in Welsh rugby union
1995–96 in European rugby union
1995–96 rugby union tournaments for clubs